The following is a list of audiobooks from the Goosebumps book series.

Original series audio cassettes (1996-1997)
The first seven audiobooks were adapted from the original Goosebumps series and released on abridged audio cassette through Walt Disney Records from 1996 to 1997. They featured a full voice-cast.

UK audio cassettes (1997)
The next four audiobooks were also adapted from the original Goosebumps series and released on abridged audio cassette in the UK through Tempo Records in 1997. They also featured a full voice-cast.

Goosebumps HorrorLand (2008-2009)
The next twelve audiobooks were adapted from the Goosebumps HorrorLand series and released in unabridged 2-disc audio sets through Scholastic Audiobooks from 2008-2009.

Classic Goosebumps (2015)
The next fifteen audiobooks were adapted from the original Goosebumps series and released in unabridged 2-disc audio sets through Scholastic Audiobooks to help promote the 2015 [[Goosebumps (film)|Goosebumps]] film.

Goosebumps SlappyWorld (2017-Present)
The next line of audiobooks were adapted from the Goosebumps SlappyWorld series for Audible audio downloads, preloaded digital audio players and unabridged multi-disc audio sets through Scholastic Audiobooks.
{|class="wikitable" style="width:99%;"
|-
! style="background:#58c035;color:#fff;"|# !!  style="background:#58c035;color:#fff;"|Title !! style="background:#58c035;color:#fff;"|Original published date !! style="background:#58c035;color:#fff;"|Narrator !! style="background:#58c035;color:#fff;"|Length !! style="background:#58c035;"|ISBN

{{Book list|List of Goosebumps books
 |book_number = 15
 |title = Judy and the Beast
 |publish_date = September 7, 2021 
 |subject = Joe Fria, Emily Lawrence
 |Subject= Jekyll and Heidi
 |short_summary = Judy Glassman lives with her brother Kenny and father Noah in a village at the foot of Evil Rock. Every winter, Kenny accompanies their dad up to the mansion at the top of the mountain to assist the rich, eccentric Grendel family with their house repairs. But this year, Judy convinces dad to let her come too. Judy has heard whispers about the Beast of Evil Rock -- a half-human creature who stalks the crags. And she's determined to find out for herself if it's true. Will Judy discover the secret of Evil Rock before the Beast finds her first?
|isbn = 1-338-75214-6
|aux1 = 2 hours and 50 minutes
|line_color = #58c035
}}
|}</onlyinclude>

See also

 Fear Street List of Goosebumps books
 Gooflumps''

External links
  at Scholastic Press

Goosebumps
Goosebumps, Audiobooks